The 2013 Speedway European Championship season was the premiere season of the Speedway European Championship era, and decided the 13th UEM Individual Speedway European Championship. It was the first series under the promotion of One Sport Lts. of Poland.

The 2013 Speedway European Championship was won by Martin Vaculík from Slovakia

Qualification 

For the 2013 season there are 15 permanent riders, joined at each SEC Final by one wild card and two track reserves.

Defending champion, Aleš Dryml, Jr. of Czech Republic, was invited to participate in all finals event, as of top European Grand Prix riders: Tomasz Gollob of Poland, Nicki Pedersen of Denmark, Andreas Jonsson of Sweden and Emil Sayfutdinov of Russia. Three weeks before Final One, Tai Woffinden of Great Britain was invited to the series also. Injured Andreas Jonsson was replaced by another the Swede Fredrik Lindgren.

Nine riders were qualified from the SEC Challenge, qualification final, preceded by three Semifinal event. The SEC Challenge was won by Jurica Pavlic of Croatia.

Qualified riders

Wild cards and track reserves

BSI—One Sports relationships 
The Speedway Grand Prix promoter, BSI of the United Kingdom, effectively prevented the appearance top riders in SEC. British federation, Auto-Cycle Union (ACU) after the withdrawal of Nicholls refused to nominate other British riders.

Because final events date do not coincide with Wolverhampton Wolves matches, ACU and BSPA have to agree of Tai Woffinden' participating in the series.

ACU and British Speedway Promoters' Association refused to appearance in a tournament qualifier British star, Scott Nicholls. On 27 July, Final One date, Nicholls need ride in British Elite League event. Then ACU does not agree that Hans N. Andersen could be replaced in Swindon Robins match. Andersen informed the club and a league that he will take part in the SEC before signing the contract.

Results 

The 2013 season consist of 4 events.

Classification

Broadcasting

See also 
 2013 Speedway Grand Prix

References

External links 
 speedwayeuro.com

2013
European Championship
Speedway European Championship